Dolecek or Doleček is a Czech surname. Notable people with this surname include:
Josef ("Jožka") Doleček (born 1912), Czech astronomer, namesake of asteroid 11126 Doleček
Gordana Jovanovic Dolecek, Yugoslav-Mexican electronics engineer, mother of Lara
Lara Dolecek, American coding theorist, daughter of Gordana
Milan Doleček (born 1982), Czech Olympic rower
Milan Doleček (rower, born 1957), Czech Olympic rower

Czech-language surnames